Government College for Women Shahrah-e-Liaquat, also known by former names including Vasant Pathshala School and Central Government College for Women, Karachi, is a women's college located on Burns Road, Karachi, Pakistan. Founded in 1917, it is under the administration of the Directorate of College Education.

The college also publishes a magazine named, Horizon.

History
It was founded as Vasant Pathshala School in 1917 by Hirdaram Mewaram and Jamshed Nusserwanjee Mehta as a religious school. As a part of religious school, a place of worship, Guru Nanik Darbar, was built by SH Totibai Gobindar Mirani.

In 1920, Vasant Pathshala School was merged with Carneiro Indian Girls High School, another school founded by Rupchand Bilaram. Later, a new building was constructed after the completion of merger of both school. The new building was inaugurated in 1933.

In 1936, another separate college was established in the premises of Vasant Pathshala School called Vishindevi Naraindas Maha Kenya Vidyalaya Inter College.

In 1962, it was renamed as Government College for Women and provincial government took control.

References

Public universities and colleges in Sindh
Universities and colleges in Karachi
Women's universities and colleges in Pakistan
1917 establishments in British India